Allantoma integrifolia, synonym Cariniana integrifolia, is a species of woody plant in the Lecythidaceae family. It is found only in Brazil. It is threatened by habitat loss.

References

Lecythidaceae
Flora of Brazil
Vulnerable plants
Taxonomy articles created by Polbot
Taxa named by Adolpho Ducke